Anatoly Nikolaevich Morozov (born 23 October 1973) is a Russian professional football coach and a former player. He is an assistant coach with FC Chernomorets Novorossiysk.

International
In 2003, he was granted Armenian citizenship in order to qualify as a defender for the national team. He received his first call-up in August 2003 . However, he has not actually gained any caps for Armenia.

External links
  Career profile at Footballfacts

1973 births
Sportspeople from Rostov-on-Don
Living people
Soviet footballers
Russian footballers
Association football defenders
Russian Premier League players
FC SKA Rostov-on-Don players
FC Chernomorets Novorossiysk players
FC Rostov players
FC Volgar Astrakhan players
FC Taganrog players